Sashika Nisansala Jayasumana (: born 28 September 1981), is a Sri Lankan songstress and playback singer. She won the SLIM-Nielsen Peoples Awards for the Most Popular Female Singer for record seven consecutive years since 2016.

Personal life
She was born on 28 September 1981 in Deraniyagala as the eldest of the family with one younger brother. She completed primary education at Udapola Primary School, Deraniyagala. Then she attended to President's College, Avissavella for grade-5 scholarship. After passing grade 5 scholarship and attended to the Dharmapala College, Eheliyagoda. She did the GCE Ordinary Level Examination at Dharmapala Vidyalaya and later attended to Anula Vidyalaya, Nugegoda for GCE Advanced Level. After passing the A/Ls, she entered University of Kelaniya in 2002 and completed a special degree in Bachelor of Arts. Then in 2006, she completed her Master of Arts degree.

She is married and the couple has two sons.

Career
Nisansala started music at the age of 5 where she used to play keyboard. Then she joined Muthuhara and Udara musical programs in television as well as some radio programs. While educating in Anula Vidyalaya, she was selected to "Thurunu Shakthi" singing competition conducted by National Youth Services Council. After winning the contest, Nisansala released her first album which gained huge popularity. Some of her popular songs of the album included Paramitha Nopuramu Api Dedena, Thol Pethi Vitharak, Sanda Reta Reta and Sanda Eliya Mamai Nam. She was invited for hundreds of outdoor musical shows where she established as a popular singer in Sri Lanka.

Her first music video was released in 2010. During this period she sang very popular singles as well as playback songs. Some of her popular music video songs include Oba Esi Piya Nohela Baluwa, Mal Sara Hee Sarin, Es Deka Pura and Husmak Durin Inna.  Sashika became a judge of the singing reality show 60 plus on TV Derana for first three seasons. In 2020 and 2022, she joined with The Voice Sri Lanka Season 1 and 2 as a coach.

Her first original music video is Chandra Payanna and it was released in 2021 on youtube. Xavier Kanishka and Praveena Dissanayake is playing the main roles and are directed by Srilankan film director Chamil Pathirana.

Awards

National Awards 

|-
|| 1999 ||| Thurunu Shakthi National Awards || First place || 
|-
|| 2000 ||| Yawwana Sammana National Awards || First place ||

Raigam Tele'es

|-
|| 2007 ||| Sedona || Best Female Vocalist ||

Sumathi Awards

|-
|| 2008 ||| Sangala Thanna || Best Female Vocalist || 
|-
|| 2013 ||| Monara Thanna || Best Female Vocalist || 
|-
|| 2020 ||| Pulingu || Best Teledrama Singer Award ||

State Television Awards

|-
|| 2008 ||| Theme song || Best Female Vocalist  || 
|-
|| 2009 ||| Theme song || Best Female Vocalist  || 
|-
|| 2012 ||| Theme song || Best Female Vocalist || 
|-
|| 2013 ||| Theme song || Best Female Vocalist  ||

SIGNIS Awards

|-
|| 2012 |||  || Best Female Vocalist ||

State Music Awards

|-
|| 2014 |||  || Best Female Vocalist || 
|-
|| 2016 |||  || Best Female Vocalist ||

Derana Music Video Awards

|-
|| 2015 ||| Oba As Piya Nohela Baluwa || Most Popular Song of the Year  ||

SLIM-Nielsen Peoples Awards

|-
|| 2016 ||| People's vote || Most Popular Songstress || 
|-
|| 2017 ||| People's vote || Most Popular Songstress || 
|-
|| 2018 ||| People's vote || Most Popular Songstress || 
|-
|| 2019 ||| People's vote || Most Popular Songstress || 
|-
|| 2020 ||| People's vote || Most Popular Songstress || 
|-
|| 2021 ||| People's vote || Most Popular Songstress || 
|-
|| 2022 ||| People's vote || Most Popular Songstress || 
|-
|| 2022 ||| People's vote || Youth Choice Female Singer of the Year ||

Bunka Awards

|-
|| 2017 ||| Achievement in Music || Special Recognition Award ||

References 

Living people
1981 births
Sinhalese singers
21st-century Sri Lankan women singers